Hermetiinae is a subfamily of flies in the family Stratiomyidae.

Genera
There are currently 6 described genera in Hermetiinae:
Apisomyla Woodley & Lessard, 2019
Chaetohermetia Lindner, 1929
Chaetosargus Röder, 1894
Hermetia Latreille, 1804
Notohermetia James, 1950
Patagiomyia Lindner, 1933

References

 Biolib

Stratiomyidae
Brachycera subfamilies
Taxa named by Hermann Loew